The Taiwan Strait Tunnel Project is a proposed undersea tunnel to connect Pingtan in Mainland China to Hsinchu in Taiwan as part of the G3 Beijing–Taipei Expressway. First proposed in 1996, the project has since been subject to a number of academic discussions and feasibility studies, including by the China Railway Engineering Corporation. The route between Pingtan and Hsinchu was chosen because of its short distance (compared to other proposed routes) and its relative geological stability (in a region frequented by earthquakes). One expert from the Chinese Academy of Engineering suggested in 2005 that the Taiwan Strait Tunnel Project was one of five major undersea tunnel projects under consideration for the next twenty to thirty years.

Reception 
The project is not considered viable due to a lack of interest from the Taiwanese, staggering costs and unsolved technical problems. At nearly   km undersea, the proposed tunnel would be 6.4 times longer than the existing Seikan Tunnel, nearly 4 times longer than the Channel Tunnel (the current longest underwater tunnel segment), and two-thirds longer than the proposed Bohai Strait tunnel project . In addition, Taiwan is concerned about the tunnel's potential use by China in military actions.  Nonetheless, in July 2013, the Chinese State Council approved plans for the project.

The project, along with the Beijing–Taipei high-speed rail corridor, has been mocked in Taiwan.

See also
 Bohai Strait tunnel
G3 Beijing-Taipei Expressway
Beijing–Taipei High-Speed Rail Corridor
G99 Taiwan Ring Expressway
China National Highway 228 (Taiwan)
Guangdong–Hainan railway

References

External links
 An Engineering Concept of the Taiwan Strait Tunnel
Socioeconomic Impact of the Taiwan Strait Tunnel

Proposed undersea tunnels in Asia
Proposed transport infrastructure in China
Proposed transportation infrastructure in Taiwan